Kam Chuk Kok is a cape on the west shore of Tsing Yi Island, Hong Kong. The shore was reclaimed for a Shell oil depot.

The Chinese name of Kam Chuk Kok means the cape of golden bamboo.

Tsing Yi
Capes of Hong Kong